Neil Smyth (6 June 1928 – 14 August 2017) was an Australian cricketer. He played three first-class cricket matches for Victoria between 1952 and 1954 and also played for Prahran Cricket Club.

See also
 List of Victoria first-class cricketers

References

External links
 

1928 births
2017 deaths
Australian cricketers
Victoria cricketers
Cricketers from Melbourne